The arrondissement of Vichy is an arrondissement of France in the Allier department in the Auvergne-Rhône-Alpes region. It has 119 communes.

Composition

The communes of the arrondissement of Vichy, and their INSEE codes are:

 Abrest (03001)
 Andelaroche (03004)
 Arfeuilles (03006)
 Arronnes (03008)
 Avrilly (03014)
 Barrais-Bussolles (03017)
 Bègues (03021)
 Bellenaves (03022)
 Bellerive-sur-Allier (03023)
 Bert (03024)
 Billezois (03028)
 Billy (03029)
 Biozat (03030)
 Bost (03033)
 Boucé (03034)
 Le Bouchaud (03035)
 Le Breuil (03042)
 Broût-Vernet (03043)
 Brugheas (03044)
 Busset (03045)
 La Chabanne (03050)
 La Chapelle (03056)
 Charmeil (03060)
 Charmes (03061)
 Châtel-Montagne (03066)
 Châtelperron (03067)
 Châtelus (03068)
 Chavroches (03071)
 Chezelle (03075)
 Chirat-l'Église (03077)
 Chouvigny (03078)
 Cindré (03079)
 Cognat-Lyonne (03080)
 Coutansouze (03089)
 Créchy (03091)
 Creuzier-le-Neuf (03093)
 Creuzier-le-Vieux (03094)
 Cusset (03095)
 Le Donjon (03103)
 Droiturier (03105)
 Ébreuil (03107)
 Échassières (03108)
 Escurolles (03109)
 Espinasse-Vozelle (03110)
 Ferrières-sur-Sichon (03113)
 Gannat (03118)
 La Guillermie (03125)
 Hauterive (03126)
 Isserpent (03131)
 Jaligny-sur-Besbre (03132)
 Jenzat (03133)
 Lalizolle (03135)
 Langy (03137)
 Lapalisse (03138)
 Laprugne (03139)
 Lavoine (03141)
 Lenax (03142)
 Liernolles (03144)
 Loddes (03147)
 Louroux-de-Bouble (03152)
 Luneau (03154)
 Magnet (03157)
 Mariol (03163)
 Le Mayet-d'École (03164)
 Le Mayet-de-Montagne (03165)
 Mazerier (03166)
 Molles (03174)
 Monestier (03175)
 Montaiguët-en-Forez (03178)
 Montaigu-le-Blin (03179)
 Montcombroux-les-Mines (03181)
 Monteignet-sur-l'Andelot (03182)
 Montoldre (03187)
 Nades (03192)
 Naves (03194)
 Neuilly-en-Donjon (03196)
 Nizerolles (03201)
 Périgny (03205)
 Le Pin (03208)
 Poëzat (03209)
 Rongères (03215)
 Saint-Bonnet-de-Rochefort (03220)
 Saint-Christophe (03223)
 Saint-Clément (03224)
 Saint-Didier-en-Donjon (03226)
 Saint-Didier-la-Forêt (03227)
 Saint-Étienne-de-Vicq (03230)
 Saint-Félix (03232)
 Saint-Gérand-le-Puy (03235)
 Saint-Germain-des-Fossés (03236)
 Saint-Léger-sur-Vouzance (03239)
 Saint-Léon (03240)
 Saint-Loup (03242)
 Saint-Nicolas-des-Biefs (03248)
 Saint-Pierre-Laval (03250)
 Saint-Pont (03252)
 Saint-Priest-d'Andelot (03255)
 Saint-Prix (03257)
 Saint-Rémy-en-Rollat (03258)
 Saint-Yorre (03264)
 Sanssat (03266)
 Saulzet (03268)
 Serbannes (03271)
 Servilly (03272)
 Seuillet (03273)
 Sorbier (03274)
 Sussat (03276)
 Target (03277)
 Thionne (03284)
 Treteau (03289)
 Trézelles (03291)
 Valignat (03295)
 Varennes-sur-Allier (03298)
 Varennes-sur-Tèche (03299)
 Veauce (03302)
 Vendat (03304)
 Le Vernet (03306)
 Vichy (03310)
 Vicq (03311)

History

The arrondissement of Lapalisse was created in 1800. The subprefecture was moved to Vichy in 1941. At the January 2017 reorganization of the arrondissements of Allier, it gained 14 communes from the arrondissement of Montluçon and three communes from the arrondissement of Moulins, and it lost one commune to the arrondissement of Moulins.

As a result of the reorganisation of the cantons of France which came into effect in 2015, the borders of the cantons are no longer related to the borders of the arrondissements. The cantons of the arrondissement of Vichy were, as of January 2015:

 Cusset-Nord
 Cusset-Sud
 Le Donjon
 Escurolles
 Gannat
 Jaligny-sur-Besbre
 Lapalisse
 Le Mayet-de-Montagne
 Varennes-sur-Allier
 Vichy-Nord
 Vichy-Sud

References

Vichy